Walter Rautmann (born 30 August 1945 in Austria) is an Austrian retired football coach and footballer. He has coached Mpumalanga Black Aces, Dangerous Darkies, Real Rovers, Moroka Swallows, Rabali Blackpool, AmaZulu, African Wanderers, Tembisa Classic, Black Leopards, Zulu Royals, PJ Stars, Garankuwa United, Values Rockets, Mbabane Swallows, and amateur Klerksdorp City.

South Africa

Before playing in South Africa he played in the Eastern Canada Professional Soccer League in 1965 with Montreal Italica. Unable to secure a contract in the United States, the retired midfielder came to the whites-only South African league with some other Austrians in the 1960s, before completing a switch to Moroka Swallows as player-coach which was the first black team he was in. Since then, he coached only black teams and was dubbed 'Mr Fitness', 'Mr Fixit', the 'Lion of the North' for his preternatural ability to save clubs from relegation. Also, Rautmann helped some South African footballers earn transfers to Austria, the first at the time.

While in charge of Rabali Blackpool, the former footballer was kicked by Gora Ebrahim after he was chosen to be substituted and has not spoken to Ebrahim since.

Back in 2015, Rautmann was moribund when his heart stopped beating for 20 seconds and had to be revived.

On South African football, he has stated that it is very corrupt.

Swaziland

Summoned to take the helm of Mbabane Swallows of the Swazi Premier League near the end of 2009 on a short-term agreement to assist Malian Alou Badara ahead of their CAF Champions League clash encountering SuperSport United, Rautmann arrived in the country by January 2010. However, he complained about the state of Swallows' training pitch upon arrival, blaming the state of the pitch for his team's cup loss to Amagaagasi as well. A month succeeding his appointment, he severed ties with the club, citing a poor relationship with Alou Badara as the reason for his resignation.

Personal life

Marrying his wife Lynn in 1968, the Austrian mentor is fluent in English, Dutch, and Afrikaans. He has a son, Michael, who was born in 1976.

References

External links 
 Walter Rautmann Advises Players With Health Issues 
 Rautmann turns down offer to join Nathi Lions 
 Spoko' was my best player ever- Rautmann
 at ZeroZero

Living people
1945 births
Austrian expatriate footballers
Austrian expatriate football managers
Expatriate soccer players in Canada
Expatriate soccer players in the United States
Expatriate soccer managers in South Africa
North American Soccer League (1968–1984) players
Black Leopards F.C. managers
Highlands Park F.C. players
Moroka Swallows F.C. managers
Austrian expatriate sportspeople in Canada
Austrian expatriate sportspeople in Germany
AmaZulu F.C. managers
Association football midfielders
Austrian footballers
Austrian football managers
Austrian expatriate sportspeople in the United States
Expatriate football managers in Eswatini
Expatriate footballers in Namibia
Dallas Tornado players
Maritzburg United F.C. managers
Austrian expatriate sportspeople in South Africa
Hertha BSC players
Moroka Swallows F.C. players
Expatriate footballers in Germany
Garankuwa United F.C. players
Eastern Canada Professional Soccer League players